Lombard is a ghost town in southeastern Broadwater County, Montana, United States.  The town was located on the east bank of the Missouri River, just north of the mouth of Sixteen Mile Creek.  

Lombard was established in 1895 as the western terminus of the Montana Railroad, and the location of its interchange with the Northern Pacific Railway.  In 1908, the Montana Railroad was incorporated into the new transcontinental main line of the Chicago, Milwaukee, St. Paul and Pacific Railroad ("the Milwaukee Road").  This lessened Lombard's importance as a railroad operational base, but the town survived as an interchange point between the Milwaukee and the Northern Pacific.

Lombard was named for A.G. Lombard, the chief engineer of the Montana Railroad.  The town's post office was first opened in 1896, and closed in 1957.

The population of Lombard declined throughout the first half of the twentieth century, corresponding with its lessening importance as a railroad town.  Lombard was deserted by the time the Milwaukee Road line through the area was abandoned in 1980, and it remains a ghost town today.

References

Further reading

Former populated places in Broadwater County, Montana
Ghost towns in Montana
1895 establishments in Montana